Wallace Rockhole is a community in Ljirapinta Ward of the MacDonnell Region in the Northern Territory of Australia, 120 km km west southwest of Alice Springs.

References

Aboriginal communities in the Northern Territory
Towns in the Northern Territory
MacDonnell Region